Dum Dum Uttar Assembly constituency is an assembly constituency in North 24 Parganas district in the Indian state of West Bengal.

Overview
As per orders of the Delimitation Commission, No. 110 Dum Dum Uttar Assembly constituency is composed of the following: North Dum Dum municipality and New Barrackpur municipality.

Dum Dum Uttar Assembly constituency is part of No. 16 Dum Dum (Lok Sabha constituency).

Members of Legislative Assembly

Election results

2021

2016

2011
In the 2011 election, Chandrima Bhattacharjee of Trinamool Congress defeated her nearest rival Rekha Goswami of CPI(M).

See also
 List of constituencies of the West Bengal Legislative Assembly

References

Assembly constituencies of West Bengal
Politics of North 24 Parganas district